Big Lake is an American sitcom on Comedy Central that debuted on August 17, 2010, and ran for one season. The series was originally designed as a vehicle for Jon Heder, but Heder left the project shortly before production started and was replaced with Chris Gethard. The series was picked up using a similar model as Tyler Perry's House of Payne and Meet The Browns with an initial 10 episode order by Comedy Central, with an option to pick up the series for an additional 90 episodes, to have 100 episodes available for syndication. The deal was not picked up after Comedy Central passed on a second season.

Premise
After losing his lucrative banking job, Josh is forced to move back to his hometown of Big Lake, Pennsylvania. Now living with his parents on their couch, Josh swears to earn back all the money he lost and repay his parents. There he reunites with his childhood pal Glenn and his favorite high school teacher Mr. Henkel. Each week the three come up with new money making schemes, although due to the ridiculous nature of them, they tend to fail and go horribly wrong every time.

Cast
 Chris Gethard as Josh Franklin — A disgraced Wall Street hotshot who lost his job and all his money. He now has to move back in with his parents.
 Horatio Sanz as Glenn Cordoba — Josh's childhood best friend who was recently released from prison.
 Chris Parnell as Chris Henkel — Josh's favorite teacher from high school, although he has no memory of Josh being one of his former students. Despite being a history teacher, he hates history and despises teaching. He is also the "Deputy Mayor" of Big Lake.
 Deborah Rush as Linda Franklin — Josh's overly cheerful mother who is often oblivious to everything going on around her, likely caused by her addiction to diet pills.
Dylan Blue as Jeremy Franklin — Josh's little brother who isn't as innocent as he pretends to be. Appears to be involved in many criminal activities.
 James Rebhorn as Carl Franklin — Josh's father. He despises Josh for losing his entire life savings.

Episodes

References

External links
 

2010s American sitcoms
2010 American television series debuts
2010 American television series endings
Television series by Gary Sanchez Productions
Television shows set in Pennsylvania
Comedy Central original programming
Television series by Lionsgate Television